Olena Shekhovtsova (born 31 May 1972) is a retired Ukrainian long jumper.

Her personal best jump is 6.97 metres, achieved at the 1996 Olympic Games in Atlanta.

Achievements

External links

1972 births
Living people
Ukrainian female long jumpers
Athletes (track and field) at the 1996 Summer Olympics
Athletes (track and field) at the 2000 Summer Olympics
Olympic athletes of Ukraine
Universiade medalists in athletics (track and field)
Universiade gold medalists for Ukraine
Medalists at the 1997 Summer Universiade
Medalists at the 1999 Summer Universiade
20th-century Ukrainian women